Marmoricola endophyticus is a Gram-positive, aerobic, non-spore-forming, short rod-shaped, endophytic and non-motile bacterium from the genus Marmoricola which has been isolated from the tree, Thespesia populnea, from the Beilun Estuary Mangrove Forest National Nature Reserve, China.

References 

Propionibacteriales
Bacteria described in 2017